François Lake in British Columbia is about  south of Burns Lake and  west of Fraser Lake. Nadina River is the inflow of the lake at the west and Stellako River is the outflow of the lake. The lake is popularly fished for its rainbow trout and char.

Because of its shape, the lake was called Nidabun, meaning "lip lake." The French-Canadians  mistook Nidaa for nedo, which meant "whiteman," and named it Lac des Français (meaning Lake of the French). The name Français later was altered to François.

See also
François Lake Provincial Park

References

 Entry at Bcadventure.com
 Information on name and lake measurements

Lakes of British Columbia
Nechako Country
Omineca Country
Range 4 Coast Land District